Gornje Kolibe is a village in the municipality of Bosanski Brod, Bosnia and Herzegovina with Bosniak ethnic majority.

References

Villages in Republika Srpska
Populated places in Brod, Bosnia and Herzegovina